Club Deportivo Comercial Aguas Verdes (sometimes referred as Comercial Aguas Verdes) is a Peruvian football club, playing in the city of Zarumilla, Zarumilla, Peru.

History
The Club Deportivo Comercial Aguas Verdes was founded on March 21, 1971.

In the 1979 Copa Perú, the club was runner-up when tied with ADT on the last round.

In the 2009 Copa Perú, the club classified to the Departamental Stage, but was eliminated.

In the 2016 Copa Perú, the club classified to the National Stage, but was eliminated by EGB Tacna Heróica in the Quarterfinals.

Honours

Regional
Liga Departamental de Tumbes:
Winners (3): 1977, 1978, 1985
Runner-up (1): 2016

Liga Provincial de Zarumilla:
Winners (5): 1976, 1977, 1978, 2009, 2016

Liga Distrital de Zarumilla:
Winners (4): 1998, 1999, 2015, 2016
Runner-up (3): 2009, 2010, 2012

See also
List of football clubs in Peru
Peruvian football league system

References

External links

 Machos para llamarse así
 Aguas removidas

Football clubs in Peru
Association football clubs established in 1971
1971 establishments in Peru